Hypophthalmus marginatus, commonly called the Mapará, is a species of demersal potamodromous catfish of the family Pimelodidae that is native to Amazon and Orinoco River basins of Brazil, Peru and major rivers of French Guiana and Suriname.

Description
It grows to a length of 55.0 cm. Caudal fin deeply forked with black tips. Body silvery. Barbels are grey to black.

Ecology
A parasite of the esophageal musculature, Kudoa amazonica was found from the fish.

References

External links
Reproductive cycle of the Amazonian planktivorous catfish Hypophthalmus marginatus (Siluriformes, Pimelodidae)
Esophageal infection due to Kudoa sp. (Myxozoa) in mapara catfish, Hypophthalmus marginatus
Kudoa amazonica n. sp. (Myxozoa; Multivalvulida), a parasite of the esophageal musculature of the freshwater catfish, Hypophthalmus marginatus (Siluriformes: Pimelodidae), from a river of the Amazon region

Pimelodidae
Catfish of South America
Fish described in 1840